Jimmy Connors Pro Tennis Tour is a video game developed by Blue Byte and originally released in 1991.

Ports 
A port of Jimmy Connors Pro Tennis Tour for the Atari Jaguar was announced in November 1993 after Ubi Soft was signed to be a third-party developer by Atari Corporation for the system, while Ubi Soft considered in releasing three more titles for the console. Despite kept being advertised and slated for an October/November 1994 launch, it was never released for unknown reasons.

References

External links 
 Jimmy Connors Pro Tennis Tour at GameFAQs
 Jimmy Connors Pro Tennis Tour at Giant Bomb
 Jimmy Connors Pro Tennis Tour at MobyGames

1991 video games
Amiga games
Amstrad CPC games
Atari ST games
Blue Byte games
Cancelled Atari Jaguar games
Cultural depictions of Jimmy Connors
Commodore 64 games
DOS games
Super Nintendo Entertainment System games
Tennis video games
Ubisoft games
Video games developed in Germany
Video games based on real people
ZX Spectrum games